Keelhilla, Slieve Carron is a national nature reserve of approximately  located near Carran, County Clare, Ireland. It is managed by the Irish National Parks & Wildlife Service.

Features
Keelhilla, Slieve Carron, sometimes referred to as the Slieve Carran Nature Reserve, was legally protected as a national nature reserve by the Irish government in 1986. The site forms a part of the wider Burren limestone landscape located on the north-east edge of the Burren plateau, with a karst topography. The sites includes karst pavement, scrub grassland, and woodland.

Some of the features of the reserve which fall under European priority habitats are the orchid bearing calcareous grassland, limestone pavement, and petrifying springs. Among the recorded animals there are choughs and peregrine falcons, and a herd of feral goats. A rare glue fungus has been recorded on the hazel trees growing in Keelhilla. The site also contains an early medieval ecclesiastical settlement associated with St Colman mac Duagh, with a number of archaeological monuments including a stone oratory, a holy well, and a graveyard. There are some older archaeological sites in the reserve dating from the Bronze Age. The site has two designated walkways.

References

Geography of County Clare
Forests and woodlands of the Republic of Ireland
Nature reserves in the Republic of Ireland
Tourist attractions in County Clare